Open source products include permission to use the source code, design documents, or content of the product.

Open source may also refer to:

Computing

Software
 Open-source license, a type of license for computer software and other products that allows the source code, blueprint or design to be used, modified and/or shared under defined terms and conditions
 Open-source model, a decentralized software development model
 Open-source software, a type of computer software in which source code is released under a license in which the copyright holder grants users the rights to study, change, and distribute it
 Free and open-source software, openly shared source code that is licensed without any restrictions on usage, modification, or distribution

Hardware
 Open-source hardware, or open hardware, computer hardware, such as microprocessors, that is designed in the same fashion as open source software
 Open-source robotics, physical artifacts of the subject are offered by the open design movement
 Open-source product development, collaborative product and process openness of open-source hardware for any interested participants

Manufacturing
 Open-source appropriate technology, is designed for environmental, ethical, cultural, social, political, economic, and community aspects
 Open-source architecture, emerging procedures in imagination and formation of virtual and real spaces within an inclusive universal infrastructure
 Open-source cola, cola soft drinks made to open-sourced recipes
 Open Source Ecology, a network of farmers, engineers, architects and supporters striving to manufacture the Global Village Construction Set

Media
 Open-source film, open source movies
 Open-source journalism, a spectrum on online publications, various publishing forms, and content voting
 Open-source record label, open source music
 "Open Source", a 1960s rock song performed by The Magic Mushrooms
 Open Source (film), an American action thriller film
 Open Source (radio show), a radio show using open content information gathering methods hosted by Christopher Lydon
 "Open Source", a 2020 album released by Brazilian Heavy Metal guitarist Kiko Loureiro

Other uses
 Open-source intelligence, data collected from publicly available sources
 Open-source curriculum, an online instructional resource that can be freely used, distributed and modified
 Open-source governance, open source in government
 Open Source Order of the Golden Dawn, an esoteric community
 Open-source religion, in the creation of belief systems
 Open-source unionism, a model for labor union organization

See also
 Open access (disambiguation)
 Open-source software advocacy
 Open-source software development
 Open-source-software movement
 Open-source video game
 The Open Source Definition, as used by the Open Source Initiative for open source software
 Open Source Lab (disambiguation)